Arundo is a genus of stout, perennial plants in the grass family.

Description
Arundo is native to southern Europe, North Africa, and much of temperate Asia as far east as Japan. They grow to 3–6 m tall, occasionally to 10 m, with leaves 30–60 cm long and 3–6 cm broad.

 Species
 Arundo collina Ten.
 Arundo donax L. – Giant cane, Spanish cane (south and east Mediterranean, to India; naturalised in many additional areas and often invasive)
 Arundo formosana Hack. – Nansei-shoto, Taiwan, Philippines
 Arundo mediterranea Danin – Mediterranean 
 Arundo micrantha Lam. – Mediterranean 
 Arundo plinii Turra – Pliny's reed – Greece, Italy, Albania, Croatia

There are over 200 species once considered part of Arundo but now regarded as better suited to other genera: Achnatherum, Agrostis, Ammophila, Ampelodesmos, Arthrostylidium, Arundinaria, Austroderia, Austrofestuca, Bambusa, Calamagrostis, Calammophila, Calamovilfa, Chionochloa, Chusquea, Cinna, Cortaderia, Dendrocalamus, Deschampsia, Dupontia, Gastridium, Gigantochloa, Graphephorum, Gynerium, Imperata, Indocalamus, Melica, Miscanthus, Molinia, Muhlenbergia, Neyraudia, Phalaris, Phragmites, Poa, Psammochloa, Rytidosperma, Saccharum, Schizostachyum, Scolochloa, Stipa, Thysanolaena, Trisetaria.

See also
 List of Poaceae genera

References

Further reading
 Douce, R. 1994. The biological pollution of Arundo donax in river estuaries and beaches. Pp. 11–13 In: Jackson, N.E. et al. Arundo donax workshop.
 Dudley, T. and B. Collins. 1995. Biological invasions in California wetlands: the impacts and control of non-indigenous species in natural areas. Pacific Institute for SIDES, Oakland, CA.
 Frandsen,. P. 1994. Team Arundo: a model for inter-agency cooperation. Pp. 35–40 In: Jackson, N. et al. Arundo donax workshop.
 Frandsen, P. and N. Jackson. 1994. The impact of Arundo donax on flood control and endangered species. Pp. 13–16 In: Jackson, N. et al. Arundo donax workshop.
 Hoshovsky, M. 1988. Element stewardship abstract: Arundo donax. The Nature Conservancy, San Francisco, CA.
 Iverson, M. Pp19–26 In: Jackson, N.E. et al. Arundo donax workshop.
 Scott, G.D. 1994. Fire threat from Arundo donax. Pp. 17–18 In: Jackson, N. et al. Arundo donax workshop.

External links

 Germplasm Resources Information Network: Arundo
 Erowid Arundo Donax vault

Arundinoideae
Energy crops
Poaceae genera